de Witte is a noble family originating from the Belgian city of Antwerp. During the 20th and 21st centuries, family members were mainly living in Belgium and France.

Originally they were probably members of the Hanseatic League.

A 1544 portrait of him, painted by a student of Hans Holbein the Younger, is exhibited in the Rijksmuseum Twenthe in Enschede.

Some members 
  alias Adrien de Witte (1464–1549)
  alias Jacques-Antoine de Witte (1629–1688)
 Jean de Witte (1808–1889) - an archaeologist, epigraphist and numismatist
 Gaston-François de Witte (1897–1980) - an herpetologist

References

Belgian noble families